The Prince Arthur Herald was a bilingual online student news blog based in Montreal, Quebec, Canada. It was founded by a group of students at McGill University in January 2011. The newspaper published new content daily using the voluntary contributions of a number of students, columnists and journalists in Montreal, Toronto, and across Canada. It ceased publication in 2019.

History
The Prince Arthur Herald was founded at the beginning of January 2011. It was named after Prince Arthur street in the Milton-Parc area. 

The publication shut down at the start of January 2019.

References

Publications established in 2011
2011 establishments in Quebec